Evolutionary ethics is a field of inquiry that explores how evolutionary theory might bear on our understanding of ethics or morality. The range of issues investigated by evolutionary ethics is quite broad. Supporters of evolutionary ethics have claimed that it has important implications in the fields of descriptive ethics, normative ethics, and metaethics.

Descriptive evolutionary ethics consists of biological approaches to morality based on the alleged role of evolution in shaping human psychology and behavior. Such approaches may be based in scientific fields such as evolutionary psychology, sociobiology, or ethology, and seek to explain certain human moral behaviors, capacities, and tendencies in evolutionary terms. For example, the nearly universal belief that incest is morally wrong might be explained as an evolutionary adaptation that furthered human survival.

Normative (or prescriptive) evolutionary ethics, by contrast, seeks not to explain moral behavior, but to justify or debunk certain normative ethical theories or claims. For instance, some proponents of normative evolutionary ethics have argued that evolutionary theory undermines certain widely held views of humans' moral superiority over other animals.

Evolutionary metaethics asks how evolutionary theory bears on theories of ethical discourse, the question of whether objective moral values exist, and the possibility of objective moral knowledge. For example, some evolutionary ethicists have appealed to evolutionary theory to defend various forms of moral anti-realism (the claim, roughly, that objective moral facts do not exist) and moral skepticism.

History
The first notable attempt to explore links between evolution and ethics was made by Charles Darwin in The Descent of Man (1871). In Chapters IV and V of that work Darwin set out to explain the origin of human morality in order to show that there was no absolute gap between man and animals. Darwin sought to show how a refined moral sense, or conscience, could have developed through a natural evolutionary process that began with social instincts rooted in our nature as social animals.

Not long after the publication of Darwin's The Descent of Man, evolutionary ethics took a very different—and far more dubious—turn in the form of Social Darwinism. Leading Social Darwinists such as Herbert Spencer and William Graham Sumner sought to apply the lessons of biological evolution to social and political life. Just as in nature, they claimed, progress occurs through a ruthless process of competitive struggle and "survival of the fittest," so human progress will occur only if government allows unrestricted business competition and makes no effort to protect the "weak" or "unfit" by means of social welfare laws. Critics such as Thomas Henry Huxley, G. E. Moore, William James, Charles Sanders Peirce, and John Dewey roundly criticized such attempts to draw ethical and political lessons from Darwinism, and by the early decades of the twentieth century Social Darwinism was widely viewed as discredited.

The modern revival of evolutionary ethics owes much to E. O. Wilson's 1975 book, Sociobiology: The New Synthesis. In that work, Wilson argues that there is a genetic basis for a wide variety of human and nonhuman social behaviors. In recent decades, evolutionary ethics has become a lively topic of debate in both scientific and philosophical circles.

Descriptive evolutionary ethics

The most widely accepted form of evolutionary ethics is descriptive evolutionary ethics. Descriptive evolutionary ethics seeks to explain various kinds of moral phenomena wholly or partly in genetic terms. Ethical topics addressed include altruistic behaviors, conservation ethics, an innate sense of fairness, a capacity for normative guidance, feelings of kindness or love, self-sacrifice, incest-avoidance, parental care, in-group loyalty, monogamy, feelings related to competitiveness and retribution, moral "cheating," and hypocrisy.

A key issue in evolutionary psychology has been how altruistic feelings and behaviors could have evolved, in both humans and nonhumans, when the process of natural selection is based on the multiplication over time only of those genes that adapt better to changes in the environment of the species. Theories addressing this have included kin selection, group selection, and reciprocal altruism (both direct and indirect, and on a society-wide scale). Descriptive evolutionary ethicists have also debated whether various types of moral phenomena should be seen as adaptations which have evolved because of their direct adaptive benefits, or spin-offs that evolved as side-effects of adaptive behaviors.

Normative evolutionary ethics
Normative evolutionary ethics is the most controversial branch of evolutionary ethics. Normative evolutionary ethics aims at defining which acts are right or wrong, and which things are good or bad, in evolutionary terms. It is not merely describing, but it is prescribing goals, values and obligations. Social Darwinism, discussed above, is the most historically influential version of normative evolutionary ethics. As philosopher G. E. Moore famously argued, many early versions of normative evolutionary ethics seemed to commit a logical mistake that Moore dubbed the naturalistic fallacy. This was the mistake of defining a normative property, such as goodness, in terms of some non-normative, naturalistic property, such as pleasure or survival.

More sophisticated forms of normative evolutionary ethics need not commit either the naturalistic fallacy or the is-ought fallacy. But all varieties of normative evolutionary ethics face the difficult challenge of explaining how evolutionary facts can have normative authority for rational agents. "Regardless of why one has a given trait, the question for a rational agent is always: is it right for me to exercise it, or should I instead renounce and resist it as far as I am able?"

Evolutionary metaethics 
Evolutionary theory may not be able to tell us what is morally right or wrong, but it might be able to illuminate our use of moral language, or to cast doubt on the existence of objective moral facts or the possibility of moral knowledge. Evolutionary ethicists such as Michael Ruse, E. O. Wilson, Richard Joyce, and Sharon Street have defended such claims.

Some philosophers who support evolutionary meta-ethics use it to undermine views of human well-being that rely upon Aristotelian teleology, or other goal-directed accounts of human flourishing. A number of thinkers have appealed to evolutionary theory in an attempt to debunk moral realism or support moral skepticism. Sharon Street is one prominent ethicist who argues that evolutionary psychology undercuts moral realism. According to Street, human moral decision-making is "thoroughly saturated" with evolutionary influences. Natural selection, she argues, would have rewarded moral dispositions that increased fitness, not ones that track moral truths, should they exist. It would be a remarkable and unlikely coincidence if "morally blind" ethical traits aimed solely at survival and reproduction aligned closely with independent moral truths. So we cannot be confident that our moral beliefs accurately track objective moral truth. Consequently, realism forces us to embrace moral skepticism. Such skepticism, Street claims, is implausible. So we should reject realism and instead embrace some antirealist view that allows for rationally justified moral beliefs.

Defenders of moral realism have offered two sorts of replies. One is to deny that evolved moral responses would likely diverge sharply from moral truth. According to David Copp, for example, evolution would favor moral responses that promote social peace, harmony, and cooperation. But such qualities are precisely those that lie at the core of any plausible theory of objective moral truth. So Street's alleged "dilemma"—deny evolution or embrace moral skepticism—is a false choice.

A second response to Street is to deny that morality is as "saturated" with evolutionary influences as Street claims. William Fitzpatrick, for instance, argues that "[e]ven if there is significant evolutionary influence on the content of many of our moral beliefs, it remains possible that many of our moral beliefs are arrived at partly (or in some cases wholly) through autonomous moral reflection and reasoning, just as with our mathematical, scientific and philosophical beliefs." The wide variability of moral codes, both across cultures and historical time periods, is difficult to explain if morality is as pervasively shaped by genetic factors as Street claims.

Another common argument evolutionary ethicists use to debunk moral realism is to claim that the success of evolutionary psychology in explaining human ethical responses makes the notion of moral truth "explanatorily superfluous." If we can fully explain, for example, why parents naturally love and care for their children in purely evolutionary terms, there is no need to invoke any "spooky" realist moral truths to do any explanatory work. Thus, for reasons of theoretical simplicity we should not posit the existence of such truths and, instead, should explain the widely held belief in objective moral truth as "an illusion fobbed off on us by our genes in order to get us to cooperate with one another (so that our genes survive)."

Combining Darwinism with moral realism does not lead to unacceptable results in epistemology. No two worlds, that are non-normatively identical, can differ normatively. The instantiation of normative properties is metaphysically possible in a world like ours. The phylogenetic adoption of moral sense does not deprive ethical norms of independent and objective truth-values. A parallel with general theoretical principles exists, which being unchangeable in themselves are discovered during an investigation. Ethical a priori cognition is vindicated to the extent to which other a priori knowledge is available. Scrutinizing similar situations, the developing mind pondered idealized models subject to definite laws. In social relation, mutually acceptable behavior was mastered. A cooperative solution in rivalry among competitors is presented by Nash equilibrium. This behavioral pattern is not conventional (metaphysically constructive) but represents an objective relation similar to that of force or momentum equilibrium in mechanics.

See also
 
 
 
 
 
 
 Theory that morality evolves like an ecosystem

Notes

References

Further reading

 Curry, O. (2006). Who's afraid of the naturalistic fallacy? Evolutionary Psychology, 4, 234–247. 
 
 Duntley, J.D., & Buss, D.M. (2004). The evolution of evil. In A. Miller (Ed.), The social psychology of good and evil. New York: Guilford. 102–123. Full text
 
 Hare, D., Blossey, B., & Reeve, H.K. (2018) Value of species and the evolution of conservation ethics. Royal Society Open Science, 5 (11). https://doi.org/10.1098/rsos.181038. Full text
Huxley, Julian. Evolutionary Ethics 1893-1943. Pilot, London. In USA as Touchstone for ethics Harper, N.Y. (1947) [includes text from both T.H. Huxley and Julian Huxley]
 Katz, L. (Ed.) Evolutionary Origins of Morality: Cross-Disciplinary Perspectives Imprint Academic, 2000 
 Kitcher, Philip (1995) "Four Ways of "Biologicizing" Ethics" in Elliott Sober (ed.) Conceptual Issues in Evolutionary Biology, The MIT Press
 Kitcher, Philip (2005) "Biology and Ethics" in David Copp (ed.) The Oxford Handbook of Ethical Theory, Oxford University Press
 Krebs, D. L. & Denton, K. (2005). Toward a more pragmatic approach to morality: A critical evaluation of Kohlberg's model. Psychological Review, 112, 629–649. Full text
 Krebs, D. L.  (2005). An evolutionary reconceptualization of Kohlberg's model of moral development. In R. Burgess & K. MacDonald (Eds.) Evolutionary Perspectives on Human Development, (pp. 243–274). CA: Sage Publications. Full text
 Mascaro, S., Korb, K.B., Nicholson, A.E., Woodberry, O. (2010). Evolving Ethics: The New Science of Good and Evil. Exeter, UK: Imprint Academic.
Richerson, P.J. & Boyd, R. (2004). Darwinian Evolutionary Ethics: Between Patriotism and Sympathy. In Philip Clayton and Jeffrey Schloss, (Eds.), Evolution and Ethics: Human Morality in Biological and Religious Perspective, pp. 50–77. Full text 
 

 
 Teehan, J. & diCarlo, C. (2004). On the Naturalistic Fallacy: A conceptual basis for evolutionary ethics. Evolutionary Psychology, 2, 32–46. 
 
 Walter, A. (2006). The anti-naturalistic fallacy: Evolutionary moral psychology and the insistence of brute facts. Evolutionary Psychology, 4, 33–48. 
Wilson, D. S., E. Dietrich, et al. (2003). On the inappropriate use of the naturalistic fallacy in evolutionary psychology. Biology and Philosophy 18: 669–682. Full text
Wilson, D. S. (2002). Evolution, morality and human potential. Evolutionary Psychology: Alternative Approaches. S. J. Scher and F. Rauscher, Kluwer Press: 55-70 Full text

External links
The Evolution of Ethics: An Introduction to Cybernetic Ethics by S. E. Bromberg
Evolutionary Ethics at the Internet Encyclopedia of Philosophy

Ethics
Bioethics
Ethical schools and movements
Evolution
Sociobiology
Evolutionary psychology